Kushal Chakraborty (born 21 July 1968) is a Bengali actor and film director. At the age of six, he played the role of Mukul in Satyajit Ray's film Sonar Kella for which he won National Film Award for best child artist in 1974.

Kushal is a civil engineering graduate from Jadavpur University.

Filmography

As actor
 Akash Choan 2016
Alor Khojen 2015
Mahasangram 2006
Tin Ekke Tin 2004
Sharbari 2003
Anamni Angana 2002
Deba 2002
Ebong Tumi Aar Ami 2001
Etai Swarga 2001
Dabee 2000
Sampradan 1999
Santan 1999
Ranakshetra 1998
Chandragrahan 1997
Prem Joware 1997
Nikhonj 1996
Kakababu Herey Gelen 1995
Sansar Sangram 1995
Bhalobasa O Andhakar 1992
Sonar Kella 1974
Samantaral 2017
Asamay 2017
Curzoner Kalom 2017

As the director

Television 
Trityo Purush (aired on Zee Bangla)
Jodi Prem Dile na Prane (aired on Zee Bangla)
Sanghat (aired on Zee Bangla)
@Bhalobasha.com (aired on STAR Jalsha) as Agni
Bojhena Se Bojhena (airs on Star Jalsha) as Sharat
Rajjotok (aired on Zee Bangla)
Raashi (aired on Zee Bangla)
Aponjon (aired on Colors Bangla)
Byomkesh (2014 TV series) (aired on Colors Bangla)
Aamar Durga (aired on Zee Bangla) as Sujoy Mukherjee
Khokababu (TV series) as Jagannath Mukherjee (aired on Star Jalsha)
Jarowar Jhumko as hirok Roy (aired on Zee Bangla)
Bajlo Tomar Alor Benu as Nishikanto Pal
 Jaahanara as Nizamuddin Sheikh (airs on Colors Bangla)
Krishnakoli as Amropali's  father Alo Chhaya as Alokendu AdhikariTitli as Aparesh BoseJamuna DhakiGangaram(aired on star jalsha) as Nepal RoyBoron(aired on Star Jalsha) as Nandan BanerjeeSarbojoya (aired on Zee Bangla) as Sanjay Chowdhury
 Madhabilata'' (aired on Star Jalsha)

Personal life 
On 11 December 2009, Kushal married Sangita Chakraborty. After divorce he remarried actress Sancharee Mukherjee in January 2015.

References

External links

Bengali male actors
Male actors in Bengali cinema
Indian male television actors
Bengali film directors
Living people
1968 births
Jadavpur University alumni
Film directors from Kolkata
20th-century Indian male actors
21st-century Indian male actors
Male actors from Kolkata
Best Child Artist National Film Award winners